P. Ravindhranath Kumar  is an Indian politician, popularly Known as O.P.R.. He was elected to the Lok Sabha, lower house of the Parliament of India from Theni Lok Sabha constituency, Tamil Nadu in the 2019 Indian general election as member of the All India Anna Dravida Munnetra Kazhagam. He is the son of O. Panneerselvam.

Career

Election bribing 
Ravindhranath contesting from Theni district for the 2019 Indian general election was caught on camera bribing people for votes in a college premises. The video shows Ravindhranath and O. Panneerselvam's supporters giving out money in a college premises. The administration of the college seems to have turned a blind eye to these activities and many claimed the bribers had reportedly paid the college's Imam to keep silent. Court cases were filed citing the incident.

Member of Parliament
He was elected to the Lok Sabha, lower house of the Parliament of India from Theni Lok Sabha constituency, Tamil Nadu in the 2019 Indian general election as member of the All India Anna Dravida Munnetra Kazhagam.

Expulsion from AIADMK 
On 14 July 2022, O. P. Ravindhranath was expelled as primary member of the party along with his younger brother Jaya Pradeep by the AIADMK Interim General Secretary Edappadi K. Palaniswami.

References

External links
Official biographical sketch in Parliament of India website

India MPs 2019–present
Lok Sabha members from Tamil Nadu
Living people
Former members of All India Anna Dravida Munnetra Kazhagam
1980 births
People from Theni district